Lucky Fred is an animated series created by Myriam Ballesteros and is a co-production between Imira Entertainment, Televisió de Catalunya, RAI Fiction and Top Draw Animation, in collaboration with Disney Channel Spain. It debuted on Disney Channel Spain and Nickelodeon Latin America on November 1, 2011. The show was targeted to a 6-12 year old audience.

Plot
Fred is a 13-year-old boy who was walking one day and saw a robot from space crash. The robot, which will turn into any electronic device Fred could ever imagine, imprints on Fred who names it Friday. However, the robot was supposed to belong to Fred's next-door neighbor Braianna, a.k.a. top-secret agent Brains, and now Fred must help to protect the planet with Braianna and Friday.

Distribution and recognition
The show was distributed in more than one hundred and fifty countries and territories. It won Best Animated Television Program By a jury of kids at the 2011 Chicago International Children's Film Festival and took first in the Best Animation European Series at the 2011 Euro Film Festival in Spain.

References

External links
 
 Official website 
 

2010s Spanish television series
2010s animated television series
2010s high school television series
2011 Spanish television series debuts
Italian children's animated action television series
Italian children's animated adventure television series
Italian children's animated comic science fiction television series
Spanish children's animated action television series
Spanish children's animated adventure television series
Spanish children's animated comic science fiction television series
Italian flash animated television series
Spanish flash animated television series
Disney Channel original programming
Animated television series about robots